Kurnool mandal is one of the 54 mandals in Kurnool district of the Indian state of Andhra Pradesh. It is administered under Kurnool revenue division and its headquarters are located at Kurnool. The mandal is situated on the banks of Krishna River and is bounded by C.Belagal, Gudur, Kallur, Orvakal, Midthur and Nandikotkur mandals. As of the 2011 census, it has 406,797 residents.

Towns and villages 

 census, the mandal has 16 settlements, that includes:

See also 
List of mandals in Andhra Pradesh

References

Mandals in Kurnool district